"E-Girls Are Ruining My Life!" (styled in all caps) is a song by YouTuber Corpse Husband, also known as Corpse. Released as a single on September 30, 2020, It also features vocals from American rapper Savage Ga$p.

Background and composition 
The song features deep bass vocals that are typically associated with Corpse and his music. The lyrics make extensive references to popular culture, particularly anime such as Bleach, Naruto, Death Note and One-Punch Man. The song itself does not connect much with the title, and the track could be interpreted as a sequel to one of Corpse's previous songs titled "Cat Girls Are Ruining My Life!"

Reception 
On the Billboard week of November 7, 2020, "E-Girls Are Ruining My Life!" entered the Bubbling Under Hot 100 chart at number twenty-four, as well as entering the UK Singles chart at number ninety. The same week, one of Corpse's other songs, "Miss You!", debuted on the Hot Rock & Alternative Songs chart, along with his previous song, "White Tee", spending a second week on the same chart.

"E-Girls Are Ruining My Life!" also peaked at number 2 on the Spotify Viral 50 and earned Corpse second place on Rolling Stone's Breakthrough 25 chart for the month of October.

On February 12, 2021, a meme was spawned on Twitter after Corpse replied to a Gymshark tweet that read "Whoever gets the most liked comment [reply] we'll put on a billboard in times square."  Many people responded, but among the most likes was Corpse's reply that said "STREAM E-GIRLS ARE RUINING MY LIFE!" He shortly sent a follow-up tweet, claiming "[We] are at war here, fighting for a billboard in Times Square".. The competitor in question was YouTuber and Twitch streamer Jschlatt, who replied "I like men". Fans rapidly responded, joking about the song being featured on a billboard with photoshopped images and memes, leading "#CORPSEBILLBOARD" to start trending on Twitter. "#proudofcorpseandgasp" and "#proudofemma" also started trending when it was revealed the song had reached 100,000,000 streams on Spotify, and a billboard advertising the song eventually went up in Times Square on March 6, 2021.

Charts

Certifications

Notes

References 

2020 songs
2020 singles
Corpse Husband songs
Songs about BDSM